Aladdin is an animated television series made by Walt Disney Television Animation which aired from 1994 to 1995, based on the original 1992 feature film of the same name. Coming on the heels of the direct-to-video sequel The Return of Jafar, the series picked up where that installment left off, with Aladdin still living on the streets of Agrabah but now engaged to the beautiful and fearless Princess Jasmine. "Al" and Jasmine went together into peril among sorcerers, monsters, thieves, and more. Monkey sidekick Abu, the animated Magic Carpet, and the fast-talking, shape-shifting Genie came along to help, as did sassy, complaining, temperamental parrot Iago, formerly Jafar's minion, but now an anti-hero.

Many of the films' stars provided the voices of their TV counterparts, with the notable exception of Dan Castellaneta filling in for Robin Williams in the Genie role.

The first season aired on the Disney Channel in early 1994 as a preview for the series. In the fall, the series simultaneously premiered on both The Disney Afternoon syndicated block and on CBS Saturday mornings. A total of eighty-six episodes were made; counting the third movie as the eighty-seventh and official series finale.

Series overview

Episodes

Season 1 (1994) 
Like The New Adventures of Winnie the Pooh, Chip 'n Dale Rescue Rangers, TaleSpin, Darkwing Duck, and Bonkers before it, several episodes of Aladdin were broadcast early on the Disney Channel as a preview for the series. Confusingly, they were aired before the release of The Return of Jafar, which takes place before the events of the series.

Season 2 (1994-1995) 
In the show's first full season, episodes premiered simultaneously in both syndication as part of the Disney Afternoon and on CBS' Saturday morning block. Both sets of episodes are listed together here.

Season 3 (1995) 
All the episodes in the third season premiered on CBS' Saturday morning block.

References

External links 
 
 
 

Episodes
Lists of Disney television series episodes
Lists of American children's animated television series episodes